Rawad Ahmed Ibrahim Abu Khizaran (born 13 July 1991) is a Jordanian professional footballer who plays as a midfielder for Jordanian club Al-Hussein.

References

External links 
 
 jfa.com.jo
 jo.gitsport.net

Living people
Jordanian footballers
Jordan international footballers
Association football forwards
Chechen people
Sportspeople from Amman
1991 births
Shabab Al-Ordon Club players
Al-Faisaly SC players
Al-Salt SC players
Al-Hussein SC (Irbid) players
Jordanian Pro League players